Kivi may refer to:
Kivi (surname)
Kivi, Iran, a city in Ardabil Province, Iran
Kivi, Khalkhal, a village in Ardabil Province, Iran
KIVI-TV, a TV station in Boise-Nampa, Idaho
Kivi, an albatross in the book Call It Courage

See also 
Kivy (disambiguation)
Kiwi (disambiguation)
Khivi